Asura dharma is a moth of the family Erebidae. It is found in Japan, India and China.

References

dharma
Moths described in 1879
Moths of Asia